Darcy Breen (born 28 April 1999 in Australia) is an Australian rugby union player who plays for the  in Super Rugby. His playing position is prop. He was named in the Waratahs squad for Round 5 of the 2021 Super Rugby AU season. He was previously a member of the  squad for the 2019 National Rugby Championship, but didn't play a match.

Reference list

External links
itsrugby.co.uk profile

Australian rugby union players
1999 births
Living people
Rugby union props
Sydney (NRC team) players
New South Wales Waratahs players